Monte Canto is a mountain of Lombardy, Italy. It has an elevation of 710 metres.

Mountains of the Alps
Mountains of Lombardy